Edward Hunter Turnbull (12 April 1923 – 30 April 2011) was a Scottish professional football player and manager. He played as a forward for Hibernian and Scotland, forming part of the Hibs "Famous Five" forward line. He then had successful spells as manager of Aberdeen and Hibs, winning a major trophy with each club.

Early life

In November 2015, he was posthumously awarded an Arctic Star military campaign medal.

Playing career
Making his professional debut at the age of 23 when the war ended, during the late 1940s and 1950s he was one of the Famous Five, the noted Hibernian forward line, along with Gordon Smith, Bobby Johnstone, Lawrie Reilly, and Willie Ormond.  During his time with Hibernian they won three Scottish Football League titles, and in 1955 he was the first British player to score in a European club competition.

Although Turnbull was selected nine times to play for Scotland and played in the 1958 FIFA World Cup, he did not physically receive an international cap at the time. This was because he did not play in any Home International matches, and caps were only awarded for playing in those matches until the mid-1970s. This situation was rectified in 2006 as a result of Gary Imlach's successful campaign for his father Stewart Imlach and other players affected by this rule to receive recognition.

Coaching career
He was manager of Aberdeen between 1965 and 1971 winning the 1969–70 Scottish Cup and finishing second in the league in 1970–71. After that he returned to Hibernian, winning the 1972–73 Scottish League Cup. He also managed their 7–0 win over their Edinburgh derby rivals Heart of Midlothian on 1 January 1973.

Turnbull died on 30 April 2011, aged 88. Hibernian chairman Rod Petrie stated that no-one had made a greater contribution to the club than Turnbull.

Honours

Player 
Hibernian
 Scottish League: 1947–48, 1950–51, 1951–52

Manager 
Aberdeen
 Scottish Cup: 1969–70

Hibernian
 Scottish League Cup: 1971–72
 Drybrough Cup: 1972, 1973

Career statistics

International appearances

Managerial record

See also 
 List of one-club men

References 

Bibliography

External links
 
 

1923 births
2011 deaths
Footballers from Falkirk
Association football inside forwards
Scottish footballers
Hibernian F.C. players
Scotland international footballers
Scotland B international footballers
1958 FIFA World Cup players
Scottish Football League players
Scottish Football Hall of Fame inductees
Scottish football managers
Scottish expatriate football managers
Aberdeen F.C. managers
Hibernian F.C. managers
Queen's Park F.C. managers
Washington Whips managers
Scottish Football League representative players
Scottish Football League managers
United Soccer Association coaches
Royal Navy personnel of World War II
Place of death missing